A cardiac stimulant is a substance which acts as a stimulant of the heart – e.g., via positive chronotropic or inotropic action.

Examples of cardiac stimulant drugs are cocaine and methamphetamine.

References

External links